22ndAnnie Awards
November 12, 1994

Best Feature Film: 
The Lion King

Best Television Program: 
The Simpsons

The 22nd Annie Awards were given by the International Animated Film Association to honor outstanding achievements in animation in 1993-1994. The Lion King won the most awards with three, including Best Animated Feature. The Nightmare Before Christmas followed with two. The Simpsons won its third consecutive award for Best Animated Television Program.

Production Categories 
Winners are listed first, highlighted in boldface, and indicated with a double dagger.

Outstanding Individual Achievement

Juried Awards 

Winsor McCay Award Recognition for career contributions to the art of animation
 Jean Vander Pyl
 Ed Benedict
 Arthur Davis

Certificate of Merit Recognition for service to the art, craft and industry of animation
 Chris Craig
 Mike Gribble & Craig "Spike" Decker
 Milton Knight
 Rita Street
 Kathy Richardson
 Bryan Mon

Multiple Wins and Nominations 

The following six productions received multiple nominations:

The following two productions received multiple awards:

References 

1994
1994 film awards
Annie
Annie